Prince Hans may refer to:

 Prince Hans of Denmark (1518–1532)
 Hans-Adam I, Prince of Liechtenstein (1657–1712)
 Hans Albrecht, Hereditary Prince of Schleswig-Holstein (1917–1944)
 Hans-Adam II, Prince of Liechtenstein (born 1945)
 Prince Hans of the Southern Isles, a fictional character in Frozen